Jacques Daviel (11 August 1696 – 30 September 1762) was a French ophthalmologist credited with originating the first significant advance in cataract surgery since couching was invented in ancient India. Daviel performed the first extracapsular cataract extraction on 8 April 1747.

Daviel earned his medical degree from the Medical School of Rouen, practiced in Marseille where he was affiliated with the medical school there, then restricted his practice to ophthalmology in 1728. He was on the staff of Hospital d'Invalides and became oculist to Louis XV.

In March 1756 he was elected a Fellow of the Royal Society. In 1759, he was elected a foreign member of the Royal Swedish Academy of Sciences.

Daviel died of apoplexy in 1762 while on a trip to Geneva, Switzerland.

References

1696 births
1762 deaths
French ophthalmologists
Members of the Royal Swedish Academy of Sciences
Fellows of the Royal Society